Delia Ephron (born July 12, 1944) is an American bestselling author, screenwriter, and playwright.

Life and career
Ephron was born in New York City, the second eldest of four daughters of screenwriters Phoebe and Henry Ephron. Her movies include You've Got Mail, The Sisterhood of the Traveling Pants, Hanging Up (based on her novel), and Michael. She has written novels for adults (Hanging Up, The Lion Is In and the recent Siracusa) and teenagers (Frannie in Pieces and The Girl with the Mermaid Hair), books of humor (How to Eat Like a Child), and essays. Her family is Jewish.

Her journalism has appeared in The New York Times, Oprah Magazine, Vogue, More, The Wall Street Journal, and The Huffington Post. In 2011, she won an Athena Film Festival award for creativity and panache as a screenwriter.

Ephron collaborated with her elder sister, Nora, on Love, Loss, and What I Wore, which ran for over two and a half years Off-Broadway. It has played in cities across the U.S., as well as in cities around the world, including Paris, Rio de Janeiro, Cape Town, Manila, and Sydney.

Filmography

Screenplays
How to Eat Like a Child (TV special, 1981)
Brenda Starr (1989) – as by "Jenny Wolkind"
This Is My Life (1992)
Mixed Nuts (1994)
Michael (1996)
You've Got Mail (1998)
Hanging Up (2000)
The Sisterhood of the Traveling Pants (2005)
Bewitched (2005)

Producer
Sleepless in Seattle (1993)
You've Got Mail (1998)
Hanging Up (2000)

Books

 (with Lorraine Bodger, under name Delia Brock) The Adventurous Crocheter
My Life and Nobody Else's
Santa and Alex
How to Eat Like a Child (1979), illustrated by cartoonist Edward Koren
The Girl Who Changed the World
Teenage Romance: Or, How to Die of Embarrassment (1981)
Funny Sauce (1986)
Do I Have to Say Hello?: Aunt Delia's Manners Quiz for Kids/Grownups (1991)
Hanging Up (1995)
Big City Eyes (2000)
Frannie in Pieces (2007)
The Girl with the Mermaid Hair (2010)
The Lion Is In (2012)
Sister Mother Husband Dog: Etc (2013)
Siracusa (2016)
Left on Tenth: A Second Chance at Life (2022)

References

External links

 
 
 
 Hey! You Stole My Name! by Delia Ephron, in The New York Times (March 10, 2012)
 Delia Ephron Writes Her Way Through Cancer to a Happy Ending by Penelope Green, in New York Times, (April 9, 2022)

1944 births
Screenwriters from New York (state)
American women screenwriters
Film producers from New York (state)
Jewish American writers
Living people
Writers from New York City
Ephron family
American women film producers
21st-century American Jews
21st-century American women